Everett Historic District is a rural village located within Cuyahoga Valley National Park.  It is registered on the National Register of Historic Places.  Everett is unique for being uncompromised by the pressures of suburban development.  It represents a typical unincorporated hamlet of the turn of the 20th century rural America.

The historic district comprises the village buildings, dating from the 1880s to the 1930s, along with their outbuildings (a varied collection of outhouses, garages, chicken coops, barns, and a milk house. Everett formed due to the existence of Johnny Cake Lock on the Ohio and Erie Canal. The settlement was renamed Unionville, and still later Everett in honor of Sylvester T. Everett, the Valley Railway's vice president and treasurer.

The district overlaps part of the Everett Knoll Complex, an archeological district associated with the prehistoric Hopewell culture.  This area was also used by the Civilian Conservation Corp for a nursery that played a key role in the development of the state and metropolitan parks in the area.

References

Bibliography

Further reading

Brose, David S.  "The Everett Knoll: A Late Hopewellian Site in Northeastern Ohio".  Ohio Journal of Science 74 (1974): 36–46.

Houses on the National Register of Historic Places in Ohio
Victorian architecture in Ohio
Houses in Summit County, Ohio
National Register of Historic Places in Summit County, Ohio
National Register of Historic Places in Cuyahoga Valley National Park
Peninsula, Ohio
Historic districts on the National Register of Historic Places in Ohio